Wang Fei (born 8 January 1993) is a Chinese footballer who currently plays for Chinese Super League side Henan Jianye.

Club career
Wang Fei started his professional football career in 2011 when he was promoted to Henan Jianye's first squad. On 15 April 2016, he made his debut for Henan Jianye in the 2016 Chinese Super League against Guangzhou Evergrande.

Career statistics
Statistics accurate as of match played 31 December 2020.

References

External links
 

1993 births
Living people
Chinese footballers
Association football defenders
Footballers from Henan
Henan Songshan Longmen F.C. players
Chinese Super League players
China League One players